Goran Ivanišević defeated Pete Sampras 6–4, 6–4 in the final to secure the title.

Seeds

  Pete Sampras (final)
  Goran Ivanišević (champion)
  John McEnroe (first round)
  Brad Gilbert (first round)
  Goran Prpić (first round)
  Alexander Volkov (second round)
  Derrick Rostagno (second round)
  Horst Skoff (first round)

Draw

Finals

Section 1

Section 2

External links
 1991 Manchester Open Singles draw

Singles